The 2022-23 season will be the 7th season of Jong FC Utrecht at the second level of Dutch football. Before that, they played in the Beloften Eredivisie.

Players

U23-team squad

Transfers

Summer

Transfers in

Transfers out

Winter

Transfers in

Transfers out

Pre-season and friendlies

Competition

Overall record

Keuken Kampioen Divisie

League table

Period 1

Period 2

Period 3

Period 4

Results summary

Results by round

Matches
The league fixtures were announced on 17 June 2022.

Statistics

Goalscorers 
Friendlies

Assists

Attendance Stadion Galgenwaard

Attendance Sportcomplex Zoudenbalch

References

External links

FC Utrecht seasons
FC Utrecht